Dream memoir of Southern Man (Vietnamese : Nam Ông mộng lục) is a memoir written by Vietnamese official Hồ Nguyên Trừng during his exile in Ming dynasty in the early 15th century.


History
Hồ Nguyên Trừng (or Lê Trừng) was the eldest son of Hồ Quý Ly who was the founder of the Hồ dynasty, and a renowned military inventor of Việt Nam for his innovation in making cannons and warships. After the defeat of the Hồ dynasty by the army of the Ming dynasty, Hồ Nguyên Trừng was captured in Hà Tĩnh in 1407 and transferred to China. He was pardoned and granted a position of supervisor in the military industry of the Ming. He was eventually promoted to Deputy Minister of Industry in the imperial court of the Ming dynasty.

At the end of his life, Hồ Nguyên Trừng decided to write his memoir to express his nostalgia about his homeland Đại Việt. The memoir was first published in China in 1442. Later Nam Ông mộng lục was brought back to Vietnam by the Vietnamese ambassador Lê Quý Đôn and had a considerable significance on the historiography and literature of Vietnam. In the foreword of the book, Hồ Nguyên Trừng wrote that he wanted to recite the stories that he had known in order to praise exemplary figures in history and provide those stories for readers. Nam Ông mộng lục is considered the first memoir and one of the earliest novels văn ngôn in the history of Vietnamese literature. However, Hồ Nguyên Trừng was not aware of the fact that his work belong to a new fictitious genre of literature instead of simply as an historical text.

Contents 
Nam Ông mộng lục is arranged in 31 chapters (thiên mục), each chapter is a story about a Vietnamese legend or a historical figure of the Lý or Trần dynasty that Hồ Nguyên Trừng considered typical of Vietnam. Today only 28 chapters remain while 3 chapters were lost. The subjects of the memoir come from relatives of the author, emperors and princes of the Trần dynasty, to famous scholars, priests and physicians. Following is the table of contents of Nam Ông mộng lục:

From its contents, Nam Ông mộng lục shows an important influence of Buddhism and Taoism during the reign of the Lý and Trần dynasties.

References 

Ming dynasty literature
Vietnamese books
1442 books
History books about Vietnam